Hacıtuğrul, Polatlı is a village in the District of Polatlı, Ankara Province, Turkey.

Archaeology 

Hacıtuğrul Höyük (:tr:Hacıtuğrul Höyüğü) is a mound located at the 60km marker of the Ankara - Polatlı highway, between the village of Hacıtuğrul, and the Yenidoğan, Polatlı train station. Gordion is located 22 km to the northeast. In the older publications, the mound is referred to as Yenidogan Höyük or Külhöyük. The mound measures 650x600 meters, and is 24 meters high. With these dimensions, it is one of the largest mounds in Turkey, spread over an area of 3.3 hectares. It is roughly twice the size of Gordion.

Excavations show that the mound was a fortified Phrygian settlement. Based on the finds, it is contemporary with the new Phrygian fortress in Gordion, that is, it is dated to the 7th-6th century BC. It was most likely an extension of the Phrygian settlement in Gordion.

Excavations were carried out by the Museum of Anatolian Civilizations between 1972-79 under the direction of Burhan Tezcan. Layers belonging to the Hittite, Phrygian and Persian Periods have been identified.

References

Literature 
 C. Brian Rose, The Archaeology of Phrygian Gordion, Royal City of Midas: Gordion Special Studies 7, University of Pennsylvania Press, 2013, p. 205, 208
 Baptiste Vergnaud, A Phrygian Identity in Fortifications?, in: Soma 2012, Identity and Connectivity Proceedings of the 16th Symposium on Mediterranean Archaeology, Florence, Italy, 1–3 March 2012, BAR international series, 2581. Oxford, Archaeopress, 2013, p. 233-241

External sites 
 Hacitugrul tayproject.org

Villages in Polatlı District